In abstract algebra, the transcendence degree of a field extension L / K is a certain rather coarse measure of the "size" of the extension. Specifically, it is defined as the largest cardinality of an algebraically independent subset of L over K.

A subset S of L is a transcendence basis of L / K if it is algebraically independent over K and if furthermore L is an algebraic extension of the field K(S) (the field obtained by adjoining the elements of S to K). One can show that every field extension has a transcendence basis, and that all transcendence bases have the same cardinality; this cardinality is equal to the transcendence degree of the extension and is denoted trdegK L or trdeg(L / K).

If no field K is specified, the transcendence degree of a field L is its degree relative to the prime field of the same characteristic, i.e., the rational numbers field Q if L is of characteristic 0 and the finite field Fp if L is of characteristic p.

The field extension L / K is purely transcendental if there is a subset S of L that is algebraically independent over K and such that L = K(S).

Examples 

An extension is algebraic if and only if its transcendence degree is 0; the empty set serves as a transcendence basis here.
The field of rational functions in n variables K(x1,...,xn) (i.e. the field of fractions of the polynomial ring K[x1,...,xn]) is a purely transcendental extension with transcendence degree n over K; we can for example take {x1,...,xn} as a transcendence base.
More generally, the transcendence degree of the function field L of an n-dimensional algebraic variety over a ground field K is n.
Q(√2, e) has transcendence degree 1 over Q because √2 is algebraic while e is transcendental. 
The transcendence degree of C or R over Q is the cardinality of the continuum. (Since Q is countable, the field Q(S) will have the same cardinality as S for any infinite set S, and any algebraic extension of Q(S) will have the same cardinality again.)
The transcendence degree of Q(e,  π) over Q is either 1 or 2; the precise answer is unknown because it is not known whether e and π are algebraically independent.
If S is a compact Riemann surface, the field C(S) of meromorphic functions on S has transcendence degree 1 over C.

Analogy with vector space dimensions 

There is an analogy with the theory of vector space dimensions.  The analogy matches algebraically independent sets with linearly independent sets; sets S such that L is algebraic over K(S) with spanning sets; transcendence bases with vector space bases; and transcendence degree with vector space dimension.  The fact that every field extension has a transcendence basis is proven similarly to the fact that every vector space has a basis; both statements depend on the axiom of choice.  The proof that any two bases have the same cardinality depends, in each setting, on an exchange lemma.

This analogy can be made more formal, by observing that linear independence in vector spaces and algebraic independence in field extensions both form examples of finitary matroids (pregeometries). Any finitary matroid has a basis, and all bases have the same cardinality.

Facts 

If M / L and L / K are field extensions, then 

trdeg(M / K) = trdeg(M / L) + trdeg(L / K)

This is proven by showing that a transcendence basis of M / K can be obtained by taking the union of a transcendence basis of M / L and one of L / K.

If the set S is algebraically independent over K, then the field K(S) is isomorphic to the field of rational functions over K in a set of variables of the same cardinality as S. Each such rational function is a fraction of two polynomials in finitely many of those variables, with coefficients in K.

Two algebraically closed fields are isomorphic if and only if they have the same characteristic and the same transcendence degree over their prime field.

Applications 

Transcendence bases are a useful tool to prove various existence statements about field homomorphisms. Here is an example: Given an algebraically closed field L, a subfield K and a field automorphism f of K, there exists a field automorphism of L which extends f (i.e. whose restriction to K is f). For the proof, one starts with a transcendence basis S of L / K. The elements of K(S) are just quotients of polynomials in elements of S with coefficients in K; therefore the automorphism f can be extended to one of K(S) by sending every element of S to itself. The field L is the algebraic closure of K(S) and algebraic closures are unique up to isomorphism; this means that the automorphism can be further extended from K(S) to L.

As another application, we show that there are (many) proper subfields of the complex number field C which are (as fields) isomorphic to C. For the proof, take a transcendence basis S of C / Q. S is an infinite (even uncountable) set, so there exist (many) maps f: S → S which are injective but not surjective. Any such map can be extended to a field homomorphism Q(S) → Q(S) which is not surjective. Such a field homomorphism can in turn be extended to the algebraic closure C, and the resulting field homomorphisms C → C are not surjective.

The transcendence degree can give an intuitive understanding of the size of a field. For instance, a theorem due to Siegel states that if X is a compact, connected, complex manifold of dimension n and K(X) denotes the field of (globally defined) meromorphic functions on it, then trdegC(K(X)) ≤ n.

See also
Regular extension

References

Field (mathematics)
Algebraic varieties
Matroid theory
Transcendental numbers